River View with Rocks is an oil on copper anonymous copy of an original painting by Flemish painter Paul Bril. The copy of the original painting is currently housed at the Rijksmuseum in Amsterdam. The painting was acquired by the Rijksmuseum in 1885.

References

Bibliography
 Maier-Preusker 1991, p. 37, note 2; p. 73
 PJJ van Thiel, All the paintings of the Rijksmuseum in Amsterdam, Amsterdam (Rijksmuseum) 1976, p. 151, no. 1314, as a copy after P. Bril

External links
Painting at the Rijksmuseum
Painting at the Netherlands Institute for Art History

1601 paintings
17th-century paintings
Collections of the Rijksmuseum Amsterdam
Paintings in the collection of the Rijksmuseum
Landscape paintings
Paintings by Paul Bril
Maritime paintings